Vlastimil Třešňák (born 26 April 1950 in Prague) is a Czech singer-songwriter and writer. In 1970s, he was member of association Šafrán. He signed Charta 77 and after he was banned for public activities throughout Czechoslovakia. In 1982, he was forced to emigrate from Czechoslovakia by StB. He settled in Sweden and returned to Czechoslovakia after the Velvet Revolution. Since then, he released many solo albums; his most recent album Alter ego was released in 2013.

Discography
 Zeměměřič (1979)
 Koh-i-noor (1983)
 Koláž (1995)
 Inventura (2005)
 Skopolamin (2007)
 Němý suflér (2010)
 Alter ego (2013)

References

External links
Official website

1950 births
Living people
Czechoslovak male singers
Czech folk singers
Czech guitarists
Male guitarists
Folk guitarists
Czech male writers
20th-century Czech male singers
21st-century Czech male singers